The 2009 CHA Men's Ice Hockey Tournament was played on March 13 and March 14, 2009 at the John S. Glas Field House in Bemidji, Minnesota. By winning the tournament, Bemidji State received College Hockey America's automatic bid to the 2009 NCAA Division I Men's Ice Hockey Tournament.

Format
The tournament will featured two rounds of play. In the first round, the first and fourth seeds and second and third seeds will each play for a berth in the championship game. The winners of the championship, played on March 14, 2009, will receive an automatic bid to the 2009 NCAA Division I Men's Ice Hockey Tournament.

Conference standings
Note: GP = Games played; W = Wins; L = Losses; T = Ties; PTS = Points; GF = Goals For; GA = Goals Against

Bracket

Note: * denotes overtime period(s)

Semifinals

(1) Bemidji State vs. (4) Alabama-Huntsville

(2) Niagara vs. (3) Robert Morris

Third place

(2) Niagara vs. (4) Alabama-Huntsville

Championship

(1) Bemidji State vs. (3) Robert Morris

Tournament awards

All-Tournament Team
Goaltender: Matt Dalton (Bemidji State)
Defensemen: Brad Hunt (Bemidji State), Dan Sullivan (Niagara)
Forwards: Matt Francis (Bemidji State), Chris Margott (Robert Morris), Matt Read (Bemidji State)

MVP
Matt Read (Bemidji State)

References

External links
Official tournament website

CHA Men's Ice Hockey Tournament
Cha Men's Ice Hockey Tournament
College sports in Minnesota